Nymphicula diehlalis is a moth in the family Crambidae. It was described by Hubert Marion in 1956. It is found on Madagascar.

References

Nymphicula
Moths described in 1956